Gregory Nash (born February 16, 1982), nicknamed "Toe" or "Big Toe", is a retired professional baseball player. He played minor league baseball in the Tampa Bay Devil Rays (now Rays) organization in 2001.

A high school dropout, Nash was discovered by the Devil Rays while playing in a semi-professional league in Sorrento, Louisiana. His life story seemed so improbable that baseball executives at first thought Nash was a hoax, similar to Sidd Finch. Despite his natural ability, compared to Babe Ruth, and the fictional Roy Hobbs character from The Natural, Nash's legal troubles shortened his professional career.

Biography
Nash is from Sorrento, Louisiana. His mother abandoned him when he was 12 years old, and his father Charles "Tuttie" Payton raised him along with his younger sister Joanna in a trailer home. Payton taught Nash to hit as a child using old socks and bottle caps in lieu of baseballs. He was expelled from two schools for fighting, and later dropped out of school altogether after being suspended for a fight in the eighth grade. In 1994 at the age of 12, Nash played in the Dixie Youth Tournament, a Little League tournament in Hammond, Louisiana. Standing   and weighing , he struck out 17 of 21 batters he faced with a  fastball, and hit two home runs. Tampa Bay Devil Rays scout Benny Latino, a former college player at Southeastern Louisiana University whose hometown is Hammond, watched the game, and made a note to look for Nash in the future, assuming he would be a star in high school. As he did not attend high school, however, Nash fell into obscurity and Latino spent seven years looking for him.

In lieu of a high school education, Nash went to work in his cousin's sugar cane fields at age 16 along with his father. He played in exhibitions against local high schools and in a semi-professional baseball league, and attended an open tryout for the Pittsburgh Pirates. At the age of 18, Latino found Nash playing in this semi-pro league, known as the Sugar Cane League, featuring amateurs and ex-minor leaguers. In a game in Tangipahoa, the scout witnessed Toe hitting  home runs from both sides of the plate, and throwing  from the mound. The Devil Rays brought Nash to their minor league camp in Princeton, West Virginia, for a workout in front of scouting director Dan Jennings. He also hit towering home runs, drawing comparisons to Yankee legend Babe Ruth for his power. After Nash went undrafted in the 2000 Major League Baseball Draft, the Devil Rays signed him for a $30,000 signing bonus. He was assigned to their fall instructional league, where he played in the outfield alongside Josh Hamilton and Carl Crawford. Nash's agent, Larry Reynolds, introduced Nash to his brother Harold Reynolds, an ESPN analyst and former major league infielder, who invited him to a baseball camp in Los Angeles in February 2001. There, Nash worked out with MLB players, including Tony Gwynn, Barry Bonds, Eddie Murray, and Alvin Davis. Harold Reynolds also discussed Nash on television. Officials from other organizations felt that the story reminded them of the hoax of Sidd Finch.

Despite legal troubles, including an arrest for felony robbery, Nash reported to spring training with the Devil Rays in 2001. They assigned him to extended spring training, and then to the Princeton Devil Rays of the Rookie-level Appalachian League in 2001, playing alongside future major leaguer Jonny Gomes. In his first season, Nash hit .240 with eight home runs and 29 runs batted in in 47 games played, and was considered a long-term project for the organization due to his lack of formal training.

According to Latino, Nash "couldn't read, couldn't write...Just wasn't ready to function in society...with an education and social skills of a kid about thirteen years old." Returning to Louisiana after the 2001 season, Nash spent nearly nine months in jail in 2002 for aggravated and statutory rape, after allegedly having sex with a 15-year-old girl. After the aggravated rape charges were dropped, Nash agreed to a plea bargain and was given a 10-year suspended sentence. The Devil Rays released Nash in September 2002, the day after he was released from jail.

After being released by the Rays, the Cincinnati Reds signed Nash in the 2002–03 offseason. The club voided his contract for unspecified legal reasons, believed to be a bar fight for which Nash was arrested. Nash was arrested again in 2005 for a parole violation, and was charged for drug possession, leading him to serve the full 10 years of his previously suspended jail sentence. Nash was released from prison in November 2013. He was arrested again, however, in 2015 on drug charges.

Personal
Nash's cousin, former NBA player John "Hot Rod" Williams, organized  the Williams All Stars, the Sugar Cane League team on which Nash played.

"The Story of Toe Nash" was featured on ESPN's SportsCenter on June 27, 2014. The feature recounted the then 32-year-old Nash being reunited with Benny Latino, and his return to the Sugar Cane League.

References

External links

1982 births
Living people
Baseball players from Baton Rouge, Louisiana
Princeton Devil Rays players
African-American baseball players
Baseball outfielders
People from Ascension Parish, Louisiana
21st-century African-American sportspeople
20th-century African-American people